The name Lannoy or de Lannoy or of Lannoy can refer to

Places
Lannoy, Nord, a commune of the Nord department, France
Lannoy-Cuillère, a village and commune in the Oise département, France
Lannoy Abbey, a Cistercian abbey in present-day Oise, France

People
 House of Lannoy: A noble Belgian family.
Hugues de Lannoy (1384–1456), Flemish traveler and diplomat
Guillebert de Lannoy (1386–1462), Flemish traveler and diplomat
Baudouin de Lannoy (1388–1474), Flemish diplomat
Jean de Lannoy (1410–1493), Flemish diplomat
Claude de Lannoy, 1st Count of la Motterie
Stéphanie, Hereditary Grand Duchess of Luxembourg (Stephanie de Lannoy, born 1984)
Charles de Lannoy, 1st Prince of Sulmona  (1487–1527), soldier and statesman in service of the Habsburg Emperors Maximilian I and Charles V of Spain
Philip de Lannoy, 2nd Prince of Sulmona (fl. 1544), Italian military leader in Spanish service
Valentin de Lannoy; governor of Hulst.
Colinet de Lannoy (died before 1497), French or Franco-Flemish composer of the Renaissance
Eustachius De Lannoy (1715–1777), Flemish naval commander of the Dutch East India Company, defeated by the king Marthanda Varma
Louis De Lannoy (1902–1968), Belgian professional road bicycle racer
Micheline Lannoy (born 1925), Belgian figure skater
Stéphane Lannoy (born 1969), French football referee
Tippy de Lanoy Meijer (born 1943), Dutch field hockey player

See also   
 Delannoy